John K. McMullen is the Commander, 9th Air and Space Expeditionary Task Force - Afghanistan, Commander, NATO Air Command-Afghanistan, and the Deputy Commander-Air, U.S. Forces- Afghanistan. In these command roles, he oversees two NATO aerial ports of debarkation, two air expeditionary wings and two expeditionary groups consisting of more than 6,900 Airmen. He also advises and assists with joint expeditionary tasked/individual augmentee taskings in the Afghanistan combined joint operating area and ensures the optimal integration of air and space power in support of Headquarters ISAF and Operation Enduring Freedom missions. As the Commander, NATO Air Command-Afghanistan, he is responsible for developing the Afghan Air Force. In addition to these three command functions, Major General McMullen serves as the Central Command Combined Forces Air Component Commander's personal representative to the ISAF Commander as the Air Component Coordination Element liaison and also serves on the ISAF Joint Command staff as the Deputy Chief of Staff-Air.

Background
Major General McMullen received his Air Force commission in March 1988 through Officer Training School. He is a distinguished graduate of the Air Force Fighter Weapons School, Nellis Air Force Base, Nevada, and also served as one of the school's instructor pilots. During his career, he has commanded a fighter squadron and served as the chief of combat plans and chief of safety. He is a command pilot with more than 2,700 hours in the F-15C and F-22.

Flight information
 Rating: command pilot
 Flight hours: more than 2,700
 Aircraft flown: F-15C, F-22

Education
1985 Bachelor of science degree, aerospace engineering, Virginia Polytechnic Institute and State University
1986 Masters of science degree, aerospace engineering, Virginia Polytechnic Institute and State University
1995 Squadron Officer School, Maxwell Air Force Base, Alabama
2000 Air Command and Staff College, in residence
2001 School of Advanced Airpower Studies, Maxwell Air Force Base, Alabama
2006 National War College, Fort McNair, Washington D.C.

Assignments
 April 1988 - May 1989, student, undergraduate pilot training, Reese Air Force Base, Texas
 May 1989 - July 1989, student, lead-in fighter training, Holloman Air Force Base, N.M.
 August 1989 - January 1990, student, F-15C initial qualification training, Tyndall Air Force Base, Fla.
 January 1990 - June 1993, F-15C instructor pilot and mission commander, 27th Tactical Fighter Squadron, Langley Air Force Base, Va.
 June 1993 - May 1997, F-15C instructor pilot, flight commander, weapons officer, 2nd Fighter Squadron, Tyndall Air Force Base, Fla.
 June 1997 - July 1999, F-15C WIC instructor pilot, flight commander, F-15C division, Air Force Weapons School, Nellis Air Force Base, Nev.
 August 1999 - May 2000, student, Air Command and Staff College, Maxwell Air Force Base, Ala.
 June 2000 - June 2001, student, School of Advanced Airpowers Studies, Maxwell Air Force Base, Ala.
 July 2001 - September 2002, chief, combat plans, 56th Air Operations Squadron, Headquarters Pacific Air Forces, Hickam Air Force Base, Hawaii
 September 2002 - December 2002, chief of safety, 48th Fighter Wing, RAF Lakenheath, United Kingdom
 December 2002 - May 2003, director of operations, 493nd Fighter Squadron, RAF Lakenheath, United Kingdom
 May 2003 - June 2005, commander, 493rd Fighter Squadron, RAF Lakenheath, United Kingdom
 June 2005 - August 2006, student, National War College, Fort McNair, Washington, D.C.
 August 2006–present, commander, 366th Operations Group, Mountain Home Air Force Base, Idaho

Major awards and decorations
Meritorious Service Medal with three oak leaf clusters
Air Medal with two oak leaf clusters
Aerial Achievement Medal with three oak leaf clusters
Air Force Commendation Medal
Combat Readiness Medal with one oak leaf cluster
National Defense Service Medal with one oak leaf cluster
Southwest Asia Service Medal
Humanitarian Service Medal
Kuwait Liberation Medal from the Kingdom of Saudi Arabia
Kuwait Liberation Medal from the Government of Kuwait

Effective dates of promotion
Second lieutenant March 18, 1988
First lieutenant March 18, 1990
Captain March 18, 1992
Major August 1, 1998
Lieutenant colonel May 1, 2001
Colonel March 1, 2006
Brigadier General September 2, 2011
Major General 2014

External links

USAF bio

Virginia Tech alumni
United States Air Force officers
Living people
Recipients of the Air Medal
Year of birth missing (living people)